The Edge is a 1997 American epic survival thriller film written by David Mamet and directed by Lee Tamahori starring Anthony Hopkins and Alec Baldwin. The plot follows wealthy businessman Charles Morse (Hopkins), photographer Bob Green (Baldwin), and assistant Stephen (Harold Perrineau), who must trek through the elements and try to survive after their plane crashes down in the Alaskan wilderness; all while being hunted by a large Kodiak bear and the men's fraying friendships. Bart the Bear, a trained Kodiak bear known for appearances in several Hollywood movies, appears in the film as the bloodthirsty Kodiak, in one of his last film roles.

Plot
Billionaire Charles Morse, photographer Robert "Bob" Green, and Bob's assistant Stephen arrive at a remote Alaskan resort with Charles's wife Mickey, a model, and a team of photographers. Styles, the proprietor of the lodge, warns everyone about leaving uncovered food out, as it will attract bears. During a surprise birthday party, Mickey gives Charles a watch, while Bob gifts him a pocket knife.

At a photo shoot, Charles observes Bob and Mickey flirting from a distance. Short on time and missing a model, Bob decides to seek out Jack Hawk, a local hunter. Charles, Bob and Stephen fly to Jack Hawk’s home, only to find a note on his door that indicates he is miles away hunting. They fly to where the man is supposed to be, but the plane strikes a flock of birds and nose-dives into a lake, killing the pilot. Charles, Bob and Stephen barely reach the shore of the lake. Lost in the crash is a book that Charles was recently given on surviving in the wild.

The three men gather wood for a fire and spend the night by the lake. The next morning, Charles uses a compass leaf to determine the direction of south. They start a hike that way, but encounter an enormous male Kodiak bear; it gives chase. Bob saves Charles as they flee over a log bridge, leaving Charles in doubt over his earlier suspicions that Bob was planning to kill him for Mickey. The group continues on and they find their way back at the lake. Distraught, Stephen distracts himself by carving a spear to fish with. He accidentally stabs his own leg and Charles tends to the wound. That night, the bear, having caught the scent of Stephen’s blood, attacks their camp, devouring Stephen and chasing Charles and Bob away.

Charles and Bob adapt to their harsh surroundings; while watching a squirrel fall for a trap they have constructed, they hear a rescue helicopter fly above. They run after it, yet fail to flag it down, and tensions rise when Bob expresses his disgust with Charles and his wealth in an argument. Charles rebuffs Bob, who settles down. They both resolve to walk their way back to civilization and abandon the remote hope of being found.

After hiking for some time, Charles and Bob reach a creek. Charles tries to catch a fish, but is ambushed by the bear and falls back to the campsite Bob is putting together. The bear stalks them throughout the night. Charles realizes that as long as this persists, they will be unable to forage for essentials, and decides that they have to kill the bear in order to survive. The following day, the pair lure the bear into a trap and engage it in a direct battle with spears. The bear wounds Bob but Charles stabs it and the bear advances on him. It rears onto its hind legs and collapses on Charles’s spear, impaling itself. Charles and Bob feast and celebrate afterwards.

Sometime later, brought together by their new comradeship, Charles and Bob come across an empty cabin along a river. Charles notices a deadfall trap outside. Inside are supplies, including a canoe, rifle, and ammunition. As Bob checks if the canoe is usable, Charles finds a receipt from the box he kept his knife in to use as tinder. The receipt contains information confirming his suspicions about Mickey’s infidelities with Bob. Charles subtly confronts Bob, who reveals that he plans to kill Charles for Mickey. He orders Charles to go outside, but before he is able to shoot him with the rifle, Bob falls into the deadfall and is badly injured. Charles refuses to kill Bob and removes him from the pit to tend to his wounds. They go downriver in the canoe together.

Charles stops and makes a fire to keep Bob warm. Bob apologizes for betraying Charles and says Mickey was unaware that he intended to murder him. A helicopter appears in the distance and Charles successfully attracts its attention, but Bob succumbs to his wounds just as the helicopter approaches. Brought back to the lodge, Charles reveals to his wife that he is aware of her betrayal by handing her Bob's wristwatch. When questioned by the gathered press on how his companions died, Charles emotionally states, “They died saving my life.”

Cast
 Anthony Hopkins as Charles Morse
 Alec Baldwin as Bob Green
 Harold Perrineau as Steve
 Elle Macpherson as Mickey Morse
 L.Q. Jones as Styles
 Kathleen Wilhoite as Ginny
 David Lindstedt as James
 Mark Kiely as The Mechanic
 Eli Gabay as Jet Pilot
 Larry Musser as Amphibian Pilot
 Gordon Tootoosis as Jack Hawk
 Kelsa Kinsly as Reporter
 Bart the Bear as The Kodiak Bear

Production
The Edge began principal photography on August 19, 1996. Footage was taken primarily in Alberta. Among the Alberta locations were Banff National Park, Canmore, Edmonton, Thunderstone Quarries, Fortress Mountain Resort and Allarcom Studios. Additional scenes were shot in Yoho National Park and Golden both in British Columbia. Filming ended on November 22, 1996.

The shooting of the film is discussed by Art Linson in his 2002 book What Just Happened?, later made into a film starring Robert De Niro. Initially called Bookworm, the script was turned down by Harrison Ford and Dustin Hoffman before Alec Baldwin settled on the role of Green. De Niro showed some interest in the role of Morse but ultimately declined. Baldwin's unwillingness to shave a beard that he had grown for the role is reenacted by Bruce Willis in Barry Levinson's adaptation of Linson's book.

Like many other actors who had worked with Bart the Bear, Baldwin was extremely impressed with how well-trained and docile the bear was. In interviews, he revealed that during filming he was concerned that the film simply would not work because of how docile Bart was. After the film was completed, Baldwin commented that Bart "should send the film editor a fruit basket every day for making him look so scary."  As for Hopkins, who had worked with Bart in Legends of the Fall, he "was absolutely brilliant with Bart," according to trainer Lynn Seus, who went on to say that Hopkins "acknowledged and respected (Bart) like a fellow actor. He would spend hours just looking at Bart and admiring him. He did so many of his own scenes with Bart."

Three months before the film was to be released, the studio felt Bookworm needed a more commercial title. Dozens of others were considered, according to Linson, until the film was renamed The Edge.

This movie was shot in Alberta, Canada, in freezing conditions. Elle Macpherson was required to perform one long scene in a Native American get-up of beads, feathers and suede loincloth. "You rehearse with a coat on and then you have to take the coat off," she said. "It feels the coldest under your arms. You don't want to ever uncover your arms again."

Music
The film's musical score was composed by Jerry Goldsmith, who worked closely with director Lee Tamahori to develop a score more diverse than other works by Goldsmith in the 1990s. Initially, the score was released on CD in 1997, upon the film's release, by RCA Records. Over time, the first release went out of print, leading to La-La Land Records issuing a limited 3500-unit pressing of the complete score, which was also out of print by July 2013. The new release contains 25 minutes of unreleased music and fixes a problem found on the RCA release affecting the track "Rescued," which contained rustling noises during some quieter parts.

RCA Records track list:
 Lost In The Wild (3:01)
 The Ravine (4:38)
 Birds (2:24)
 Mighty Hunter (1:34)
 Bitter Coffee (3:03)
 Stalking (5:47)
 Deadfall (6:15)
 The River (2:21)
 Rescued (6:04)
 The Edge (2:57)

La-La Land Records track list:
 Early Arrival (1:32)*
 Lost In The Wild(s) (2:59)
 A Lucky Man/Open Door (1:41)* (does not include the final orchestral outburst as the "bear" bursts through the door, which only lasts for a few seconds)
 Mighty Hunter (1:31)
 The Spirit (0:36)*
 Birds (2:22)
 The Fire / Breakfast (2:31)*
 Rich Man (0:58)*
 The Ravine (4:36)
 Bitter Coffee (3:01)
 Wound (1:38)*
 Stephen's Death (2:26)* (contains an unused ending from 1:45 onwards)
 The Cage / False Hope / No Matches (3:34)* (contains crossfades between the three cues, although they are separated in the film)
 Stalking (5:46)
 Deadfall / Bear Fight (6:21)
 The Discovery / Turn Your Back (5:01)* (contains a brief alternate segment at 1:34 – 1:46)
 The River (2:26)
 Rescued (6:03)
 End Title (Lost In The Wild)(s) (1:59)*
 The Edge (2:55)

Bonus tracks:
 False Hope (Alternate Take) (1:08)* (alternate of 0:56 – 2:00 of track 13, with more percussion and an additional brass melody)
 Rescued (Film Version Ending) (1:19)* (alternate ending of track 18, reflecting the film version)
 The Edge (Alternate Take) (3:00)* (alternate recording of track 20)
 = Previously unreleased

Release
The Edge had its premiere at the Toronto International Film Festival in Canada on September 6, 1997. It was released in the U.S. on September 26, 1997 in 2,351 theaters, and grossed $7.7 million during its opening weekend. It went on to gross $27.8 million in the U.S. and $15.4 million overseas, for a worldwide total of $43.3 million in its theatrical run.

Reception
Upon release, The Edge received mixed to positive reviews from critics. Based on 50 reviews collected by Rotten Tomatoes, the film received a 62% approval rating, with an average score of 6.3/10. The consensus reads, "The Edge is an entertaining hybrid of brainy Mamet dialogue with brawny outdoors action—albeit one that sadly lacks as much bite as its furry antagonist." Roger Ebert  of the Chicago Sun-Times gave the film 3 out of 4 stars, writing that the filmmakers did well by not going berserk with the action sequences as other films do. He did criticize the ending, saying that:

Home media

Following its initial release on VHS, The Edge was released on a non-anamorphic widescreen NTSC DVD in the US, with no extras, save the original theatrical trailer. Meanwhile, PAL DVDs released in Europe, Australia, etc. feature an anamorphic transfer, the trailer, a six-minute featurette, seven short cast and crew interviews and five text biographies.

As of 2017 (for its 20th Anniversary), the film has also been released on Blu-ray in the US and Germany, with the same extras as each country's DVD.

References

External links

 

1997 films
1990s buddy films
1990s disaster films
1997 drama films
20th Century Fox films
American epic films
American adventure drama films
American aviation films
American buddy drama films
American disaster films
American survival films
Canadian aviation films
Canadian disaster films
Canadian drama films
Survival films
Films about aviation accidents or incidents
Films about bears
Films about death
Films directed by Lee Tamahori
Films produced by Art Linson
Films scored by Jerry Goldsmith
Films set in Alaska
Films set in forests
Films shot in Edmonton
Films shot in British Columbia
Grizzly bears in popular culture
Films with screenplays by David Mamet
1990s English-language films
1990s American films
1990s Canadian films
1997 thriller films